USS LST-2  was a LST(2) Landing Ship, Tank of World War II.

One of the first s, she served with the United States Navy in before she was transferred to the Royal Navy in November 1944.

At the end of the war she was returned to the US Navy before disposal.

Construction 
LST-2 was laid down on 23 June 1942, at Pittsburgh, Pennsylvania by the Dravo Corporation; launched on 19 September 1942; sponsored by Nancy Jane Hughes; and commissioned on 9 February 1943.

USN service history
LST-2 was assigned to the European Theater. She participated in North African campaign prior to taking part in the Allied invasion of Sicily in July 1943. This was followed by the Allied invasion of Italy in September the same year. LST-2 then took part in the Invasion of Normandy in June 1944.

Royal Navy service
LST-2 was decommissioned from the USN and commissioned into the Royal Navy on 29 November 1944, as HM LST-2. She performed sea trials December 1944, in Scotland. She then prepared for Far East service between December 1944 and August 1945, at Tyne. LST-2 sailed from Southampton on 17 August 1945, for Bombay, India, via Port Said, Egypt, and the Suez Canal, arriving at her destination on 21 September 1945. She had railroad tracks installed and made various trips between the ports of Madras, India, Singapore, and Trincomalee, Sri Lanka. She was returned to the US Navy in Subic Bay on 13 April 1946, and struck on 5 June 1947.

Final disposition
On 5 December 1947, she was sold to Bosey, Philippines.

Awards
LST-2 earned four battle stars for World War II service.

References

Bibliography

External links

 
 http://www.criticalpast.com/stock-footage-video/horgan

 

1942 ships
Ships built in Pittsburgh
LST-1-class tank landing ships of the United States Navy
LST-1-class tank landing ships of the Royal Navy
World War II amphibious warfare vessels of the United States
World War II amphibious warfare vessels of the United Kingdom
Ships built by Dravo Corporation